Group B of the 1997 Fed Cup Americas Zone Group I was one of two pools in the Americas Zone Group I of the 1997 Fed Cup. Five teams competed in a round robin competition, with the top two teams advancing to the knockout stage, and the bottom team being relegated down to 1998 Group II.

Chile vs. Venezuela

Peru vs. Puerto Rico

Colombia vs. Venezuela

Chile vs. Puerto Rico

Colombia vs. Peru

Venezuela vs. Puerto Rico

Colombia vs. Puerto Rico

Peru vs. Chile

Peru vs. Venezuela

  placed last in the pool, and thus was relegated to Group II in 1998, where they placed first in their pool of eight and as such advanced back to Group I for 1998.

See also
Fed Cup structure

References

External links
 Fed Cup website

1997 Fed Cup Americas Zone